Thembekile Richard Majola is a South African politician who serves as a Member of the National Assembly of South Africa for the Democratic Alliance (DA). He became an MP in May 2014. He was the deputy speaker of the Western Cape Provincial Parliament from 2009 to 2012 and the speaker from 2012 to 2014.

In May 2019, the DA parliamentary caucus nominated Majola to be the party's candidate for National Assembly. He lost to the ANC's Thandi Modise after receiving only 83 votes compared to Modise's 250 votes. He was elected as a member of the Pan-African Parliament in June.

References

External links
Mr Thembekile Richard Majola – Parliament of South Africa
Mr Thembekile Richard Majola – People's Assembly

Living people
Year of birth missing (living people)
Xhosa people
Politicians from the Western Cape
Members of the Western Cape Provincial Parliament
Members of the National Assembly of South Africa